William Ling (1 August 1908 – 8 May 1984) was an English football referee from Stapleford, Cambridgeshire, who refereed the 1954 FIFA World Cup Final.

1948 Olympic Games
Ling rose quickly through the ranks as a referee. He was initially on the supplementary list as a Football League match official but even so was selected to participate in the 1948 Olympic Games football tournament along with George Reader, Stanley Boardman and A. C. Williams from Brighton. Ling refereed both the first round match involving Sweden, the quarter-final involving Italy and was then selected for the final between Sweden and Yugoslavia. The final itself turned on two penalty decisions early in the second half (both which were denied to the Yugoslavians) and which affected their temperament. Bernard Joy, in the 1960 publication "Association Football" (p. 470), wrote: "The setbacks rattled the Yugoslavs, their behaviour got out of hand for a spell and they did not recover their rhythm. What made matters worse was when Gunnar Gren converted a penalty midway through the second half. It is true that Gunnar Nordahl was bowled over, but the offence looked no worse than those committed by the Swedish centre half Bertil Nordahl."

1951 FA Cup Final
By the start of the next season (1948–49) Ling had become a Football League referee, and within 3 years had been appointed to control an FA Cup Final.

Ling refereed the FA Cup Final in 1951, in which Newcastle United beat Blackpool with two Jackie Milburn goals.

1954 World Cup
The 1954 World Cup was only his second international tournament not having been selected for the 1950 FIFA World Cup. He was one of a group of four referees appointed from the United Kingdom for the 1954 tournament. The others were Benjamin Mervyn Griffiths from Wales, Arthur Ellis from Yorkshire and Charles Edward Faultless (Scotland). In the course of the tournament, Ling had already refereed the Group match between Hungary and West Germany (in which the Hungarians had won 8–3 against the West German team of mainly reserve players) and had assisted Arthur Ellis during the Battle of Berne quarter-final. In the final he was assisted by Griffiths and the Italian Vincenzo Orlandini.

The Final
Ling's part in the final, between Hungary and West Germany, became slightly controversial because he accepted Griffith's offside flag in the final minutes to deny Ferenc Puskás a 3-3 equalizer that could have sent the game into extra-time.

West German radio reporter Herbert Zimmermann had called Puskás offside well before he kicked.

Willy Meisl observed, later, that it appeared that goal keeper Gyula Grosics had struck Ling following the final whistle. Nothing came of this incident and the mood amongst the Hungarians had settled when the trophy was handed to the West Germans.

The Miracle of Bern
The final match itself became the subject of a German film Miracle of Bern in which the story of the match is told. Joachim Floryszak, a non-League German football referee and civil servant, starred as Ling after contacting the director Sönke Wortmann begging to be given a place in the film.

References

Print

"Association Football", Bernard Joy, 1960.

Internet

1908 births
1984 deaths
English football referees
FA Cup Final referees
FIFA World Cup Final match officials
1954 FIFA World Cup referees
Olympic football referees
People from Stapleford, Cambridgeshire